Honda has produced the following cars, SUVs, and light trucks.

Current models

Former models

Jointly developed cars
During the late 1980s and early 1990s, Honda collaborated with Rover in the development and marketing of the Honda Concerto, Rover 200, 400, 600 and 800.  The 800 was called the Sterling in the US.
Honda partnered with Isuzu in the 1990s to produce the Passport and the Acura SLX.

Concept vehicles

Racing vehicles
1964 RA271
1965 RA272
1966 RA273
1967 RA300
1968 RA301
1968 RA302
1969 R-1300
1991 RC100
1992 RC101
1994 NSX GT2
1995 NSX GT1 Turbo
1995–1998 Accord (Super Touring)
1996 RC101B
1999–2000 Accord (Super Touring)
1999 RA099
1997–2009 NSX-GT
2002 Civic Type R (S2000)
2002 Civic Type R (BTC-T)
2004 Accord Euro R (S2000)
2005 Integra Type R (BTC-T)
2006 RA106
2007 RA107
2007 Acura ARX-01
2007 Civic Type R FN2 R3
2008 RA108
2009 Acura ARX-02a
2010–2013 HSV-010 GT
2012 HPD ARX-03
2012–2013 Civic WTCC (S2000)
2014–2016 NSX Concept-GT
2014 HPD ARX-04b
2014–2017 Civic WTCC (TC1)
2015 Civic Type R TCR (FK2)
2017–present NSX-GT
2017 NSX GT3
2018 Acura ARX-05
2018 Civic Type R TCR (FK8)

Honda-powered racing vehicles

 1983 Spirit-Honda 201
 1983 Spirit-Honda 201C
 1983 Williams-Honda FW09
 1984 Williams-Honda FW09B
 1985 Williams-Honda FW10
 1986 Williams-Honda FW11
 1987 Williams-Honda FW11B
 1987 Lotus-Honda 99T
 1988 McLaren-Honda MP4/4
 1988 Lotus-Honda 100T
 1989 McLaren-Honda MP4/5
 1990 McLaren-Honda MP4/5B
 1991 McLaren-Honda MP4/6
 1991 Tyrrell-Honda 020
 1992 McLaren-Honda MP4/6B
 1992 McLaren-Honda MP4/7A
 2000 BAR-Honda 002
 2001 Jordan-Honda EJ11
 2001 BAR-Honda 003
 2002 Jordan-Honda EJ12
 2002 BAR-Honda 004
 2003 BAR-Honda 005
 2004 BAR-Honda 006
 2005 BAR-Honda 007
 2006 Super Aguri-Honda SA05
 2006 Super Aguri-Honda SA06
 2007 Super Aguri-Honda SA07
 2008 Super Aguri-Honda SA08
 2015 McLaren-Honda MP4-30
 2016 McLaren-Honda MP4-31
 2017 McLaren-Honda MCL32
 2018 Toro Rosso-Honda STR13
 2019 Red Bull-Honda RB15
 2019 Toro Rosso-Honda STR14
 2020 Red Bull-Honda RB16
 2020 AlphaTauri-Honda AT01
 2021 Red Bull-Honda RB16B
 2021 AlphaTauri-Honda AT02
 2023 Red Bull-Honda RBPT RB19
2023 AlphaTauri-Honda RBPT AT04

Former commercial light trucks
Street (1981-1999)
T360 (1963-1967)
T500 (1964-1967)
TN360/TN-III (1967-1977)

See also 

 List of Acura vehicles
 List of Honda engines
 List of Honda motorcycles
 VTEC

References

External links
 Honda Worldwide
 Honda Hybrids

Honda vehicles